Connie Egan is a Northern Irish politician who is an Alliance Party Member of the Legislative Assembly (MLA). She was elected as an MLA in the 2022 Northern Ireland Assembly election for North Down.

Political career

Early career (2019-2022) 
Egan was elected as an Alliance Party Councillor for Bangor West DEA in Ards and North Down Borough Council in the 2019 local elections. She topped the poll with 20.16% of the vote and gained a seat at the expense of the DUP. She was the youngest woman elected ever to the council.

Previously, she was employed as Constituency and Research Officer to Chair of the Assembly Education Committee, Alliance MLA Chris Lyttle.

Member of the Legislative Assembly (2022-) 
Connie Egan ran alongside Andrew Muir, who had been co-opted into the Assembly in December 2019 to replace Stephen Farry, as an Alliance candidate for the 2022 Assembly election in North Down. She polled 5,224 FPVs as Alliance increased their vote in the constituency by 10.3%. She was elected on the 9th stage, taking a seat from the Green Party's Rachel Woods. This, combined with the loss of Clare Bailey in Belfast South, left the Greens with no representation in the Assembly.

Personal life 
She is a member of Amnesty International and is a Governor of Trinity Nursery School Bangor. In her spare time, she plays for Holywood Ladies FC.

References

External links 

Living people
Alliance Party of Northern Ireland MLAs
Northern Ireland MLAs 2022–2027
Year of birth missing (living people)
21st-century women politicians from Northern Ireland
Female members of the Northern Ireland Assembly
Women councillors in Northern Ireland
Alliance Party of Northern Ireland councillors